Hlubočky is a municipality and village in Olomouc District in the Olomouc Region of the Czech Republic. It has about 4,200 inhabitants. It is the most populated municipality in the region without the town statute.

On the north it borders to the military training area Libavá.

Administrative parts

Villages of Hrubá Voda, Mariánské Údolí and Posluchov are administrative parts of Hlubočky.

Economy
The municipality serves as a recreational area, especially for inhabitants of Olomouc. It has about 1,000 holiday cottages. There are also two ski resorts.

The Honeywell Aerospace Work Olomouc is located there, formerly known as Moravia Aerospace Motor Works.

References

Villages in Olomouc District